Sangrumba साङरुम्बा is a town and Village Development Committee in Ilam District in the Province No. 1 of eastern Nepal. At the time of the 1991 Nepal census it had a population of 4,607 persons living in 839 individual households. According to the VDC report of 2068 BS, the total population was 6,288 and the total number of households was 1,227, an average of 5.12 members per household.

Sangrumba village development committee lies almost in the middle part of the Ilam district . The boundary touches Ilam, SantiDanda, Mangalbare, Jitpur, Sidhithumka and Soyak VDC. Its boundaries are from 26° 52′ 40″ to 26° 56′ 18″ north, and from 87° 50′ 44″ to 87° 54′ 44″ east. The village covers approximately 19 square km. south of Ilam town and its headquarters. Due to the change in height from 500 to 1760 meters above sea level, its temperature ranges from 2 to 36 degrees Celsius.

The name Sangrumba derives from the Limbu language. "Sanwa" means buffalo and "rumba" means drowned. It has one higher secondary school (est. 2008 BS/1951 AD) located in Ward No. 3 and three lower secondary schools in Wards Nos. 2, 4 and 9. There are also primary schools in each ward, as well as four child development centres.

References

Sangrumba formerly was a VDC  now it’s a ward no. 12 under the jurisdiction of  Ilam Municipality in Ilam District in the Province no.1 (Province No. 1 )of eastern Nepal. At the time of the 1991 Nepal census it had a population of 4,607 persons living in 839 individual households.[1] According to the VDC report of 2068 BS, the total population was 6,288 and the total number of households was 1,227, an average of 5.12 members per household.

After the political and  judicial demarcation of the physical boundary Sangrumba VDC has been shrink due to the detachment of former three wards ie. wards 7, 8 and 9 and were merged to Deumai Municipality. Now Sangrumba VDC has become a ward no. 12 of  Ilam Municipality(Sangrumba is a tole) which lies almost in the middle part of the Ilam district . The boundary touches former  Ilam, DeuMai Municipality (SantiDanda), DeuMai Municipality (Mangalbare), DeuMai Municipality (Jitpur), DeuMai Municipality (Sidhithumka) and Ilam Municipality-11 (Soyak). Sangrumba covers approximately 12 square km. south of Ilam town and its headquarters. Its temperature varies from 2 to 36 degrees Celsius due to the variation of its altitude from 500 to 1760 metres above sea level.

The name Sangrumba derives from the Limbu language. "Sanwa" means buffalo and "rumba" means drowned. It has two high school, one public school from Nursery to class 12, with English medium up to class 8 (est. 2008 BS/1951 AD) and one private school running up to class 10 located in former Ward No. 3, two basic level(1-8) schools in former  wards no. 2, and 4 and a basic level(1-5) school in former ward no. 5. All the child development centres have merged into nearby schools.

Ilam District